Gillingham Football Club is an English association football club originally formed in 1893 under the name New Brompton F.C.  The club adopted its present name in 1913, and played in the Southern League until 1920, when that league's top division was absorbed into the Football League as its new Division Three.  The "Gills" were voted out of the league in favour of Ipswich Town at the end of the 1937–38 season, but returned 12 years later, when that league was expanded from 88 to 92 clubs.

Twice in the late 1980s Gillingham came close to winning promotion to the second tier of English football, but a decline then set in and in 1993 the club narrowly avoided relegation to the Football Conference.  In 2000, Gillingham reached the second tier of the English league for the first time in the club's history. They went on to spend five seasons at this level, achieving a club record highest league finish of eleventh place in the 2002–03 season before being relegated twice to return to the league's bottom division, known since 2004 as Football League Two.  The club has won honours at a professional level namely the Football League Fourth Division championship in the 1963–64 season as well as the Football League Two championship in the 2012–13 season.

Seasons

Key

Division shown in bold when it changes due to promotion, relegation or league reorganisation.  Top scorer shown in bold when he set or equalled a club record.

Key to league record:
P – Games played
W – Games won
D – Games drawn
L – Games lost
GF – Goals for
GA – Goals against
Pts – Points
Pos – Final position

Key to rounds:
QR1 – First qualifying round
QR2 – Second qualifying round, etc.
RInt – Intermediate round
R1 – First round
R2 – Second round, etc.
QF – Quarter-final
SF – Semi-final
Grp – Group stage
GrpS – Group stage (Southern section)
R1S – First round (Southern section)
R2S – Second round (Southern section), etc.
R1SE – First round (South Eastern section)
SQF – Quarter-final (Southern section)
n/a – Not applicable

Key to divisions/cups:
Champ – EFL Championship
Lge 1 – EFL League One
Div 1 – Football League First Division
Div 2 – Football League Second Division
Div 3 – Football League Third Division
Div 3S – Football League Third Division South
Div 4 – Football League Fourth Division
SL – Southern League
KL – Kent League
TMC – Thames and Medway Combination
AMC – Associate Members Cup
D3SC – Football League Third Division South Cup
FAM – FA Amateur Cup
FLGC – Football League Group Cup
FLT – Football League Trophy
KLC – Kent League Cup
SLC – Southern League Cup

Notes

References
General
 
 

Specific

Seasons
 
Gillingham F.C.